Sasscer is a surname, and may refer to:

Frederick Sasscer, Jr., attorney, journalist and educator from Upper Marlboro, Maryland
Lansdale Ghiselin Sasscer, represented the fifth district of the state of Maryland in the United States House of Representatives for seven terms 1939–1953
Lansdale Ghiselin Sasscer, Jr., member of the Maryland House of Delegates, first elected in 1954

See also
Digges-Sasscer house, an historic building in Upper Marlboro, Maryland
Sasscer Tobacco Barn, an historic building in Brandywine, Maryland